The minister of Science is a vacant office that was in the Cabinet of Canada and existed under various forms from 1971 to 2019, when the portfolio's responsibilities were absorbed into the innovation, science and industry portfolio.

History
The portfolio was called the Minister of State for Science and Technology from 1971 until 1990, when a cabinet reshuffle saw the creation of two new science-related full cabinet positions: the Minister of Industry, Science and Technology, and the Minister for Science. The former combined aspects of the now-defunct post of Minister of Regional Industrial Expansion and the Minister of State for Science and Technology. While it was active, two of the three full ministers for science were simultaneously Minister of State for Small Business.

When Jean Chrétien came to power in 1993, he did not nominate a full minister for science. Instead, he created the position of Secretary of State (Science, Research and Development), which was assigned by Order-in-Council to assist the Minister of Industry. While this position subsequently changed name in 2008 to Minister of State (Science and Technology), its role did not change much until 2015.

In 2015 under the first Trudeau government, Kirsty Duncan was appointed to the newly-created position of Minister of Science. However, this position remained under the same legal framework as its predecessor, responsible for assisting the senior portfolio of Minister of Innovation, Science and Economic Development (the restyled Minister of Industry). Duncan's portfolio was expected to oversee basic research, while Navdeep Bains would oversee applied science. In July 2018, the office's portfolio was expanded to include responsibility for Sport Canada and was renamed to Minister of Science and Sport.

Following the 2019 federal election, the portfolio became vacant and Bains' portfolio was expanded—he was appointed as the Minister of Innovation, Science and Industry (previously called, Innovation, Science and Economic Development).

Ministers

Key:

References

External links 
 Minister of Science - Innovation, Science and Economic Development Canada

Canada
Science